The Tim Adams Memorial Trophy is presented annually by the Ontario Hockey League to the minor ice hockey player selected as the most valuable player of the OHL Cup. Tim Adams was a graduate of the Greater Toronto Hockey League and a long time coach of both the Toronto Marlboros and Toronto Young Nationals. Tim Adams died at an early age from cancer.

Winners
 List of winners of the Tim Adams Memorial Trophy.

See also
 List of Canadian Hockey League awards

References

External links
 Ontario Hockey League

Ontario Hockey League trophies and awards
Awards established in 2003